Marie Le Net (born 25 January 2000) is a French road and track cyclist, who currently rides for UCI Women's WorldTeam . Le Net won the silver medal in the junior women's road race at the 2018 UCI Road World Championships.

Major results
2022
 7th Dwars door Vlaanderen
 Tour de France
 Stage 6

References

External links

2000 births
Living people
French female cyclists
French track cyclists
People from Pontivy
Olympic cyclists of France
Cyclists at the 2020 Summer Olympics
Sportspeople from Morbihan
Cyclists from Brittany
21st-century French women